Calder is a surname of Scottish origin. Notable people with the surname include:

 Alexander Milne Calder (1846–1923), American sculptor, father of:
 Alexander Stirling Calder (1870–1945), American sculptor, father of:
 Alexander Calder (1898–1976), American sculptor, inventor of mobile sculpture
 Alexander Calder (Beaumont, Texas) (1806–1853), first mayor of Beaumont, Texas
 Alison Calder (born 1969), Canadian poet and literary critic
 Angus Calder (born 1942), Scottish writer, historian and poet, son of Peter Calder
 Barbara Calder (1924-2018), British yachtswoman
 Bob Calder (born 1907), Scottish footballer
 Clive Calder (born 1946), South African-born British billionaire recording executive and businessman
 David Calder (actor) (born 1946), English actor
 David Calder (rower) (born 1978), Canadian rower
 David O. Calder (1823–1884), Mormon pioneer
 Eddie Calder, American college basketball player
 Finlay Calder (b. 1957), Scottish rugby player
 Frank Calder (1877–1943), British-born Canadian ice hockey executive, journalist, and first National Hockey League president
 Frank Arthur Calder (1915–2006), Canadian politician, plaintiff in Calder v British Columbia (AG)
 Harry Calder (1901–1995), South African cricketer
 James Calder (disambiguation) (1826–1893), 5th president of Pennsylvania State University
 James Alexander Calder (1868–1956), Canadian politician
 Jean Calder (1932/1933–2022), Australian humanitarian worker
 Jim Calder (footballer) (born 1960), Scottish footballer
 Jim Calder (rugby league), New Zealand rugby league international
 Jim Calder (rugby union) (born 1957), Scottish rugby union international
 John Calder (1927–2018), founder of Calder Publishing
 Katherine Calder (born 1980), New Zealand cross-country skier
 Kent E. Calder (born 1948), American professor of East Asian studies
 Mary Gordon Calder (c. 1906-1992), Scottish palaeobotanist
 Muffy Calder (born 1958), Canadian-born Scottish computer scientist 
 Nigel Calder (born 1931), British science writer, son of Peter Calder, father of Simon Calder
 Peter Ritchie Calder (1906–1982), Scottish author, journalist and academic, father of Nigel Calder
 Rebecca Calder (born 1981), English actress
 Robert Calder (1745–1818), British naval officer
 Robert Calder (priest) (1650?–1723), clergyman of the Scottish Episcopal Church, author, and controversialist
 Sam Calder (born 1916), Australian politician
 Simon Calder (born 1955), travel writer
 Tony Calder (1943–2018), English music manager
 William M. Calder (1869–1945), senator from New York

References

Surnames of Scottish origin